The Forest Unseen: A Year's Watch in Nature is a 2012 book written by David G. Haskell.

Summary
The book is divided in 43 short chapters ordered by date and roughly covering a whole year. In each of them the author, which visits almost every day a single square meter randomly chosen of an old-growth forest of Cumberland Plateau (Tennessee), describes what happens to plants, animals and insects living there. These observations give him the opportunity to write not only about the small-scale forest ecology but also on worldwide natural processes. He often calls his small observation field mandala, inspired by the paintings of sand created by Tibetan as a support for meditation.

Awards
 Winner of the 2012 National Outdoor Book Award for Natural History Literature
 Winner of the 2013 Reed Environmental Writing Award.
 Winner of the 2013 National Academies Communication Award for Best Book. 
 Finalist for the 2013 Pulitzer Prize in General Nonfiction. 
 Winner of the 2016 Dapeng Nature Book Award (China).

Translations 

As far as late 2017 The Forest Unseen has been translated into ten languages.

References 

2012 non-fiction books
Ecology books
English-language books
Award-winning books
Viking Press books